ParsOnline is an Iranian Internet Service Provider based in Tehran. Founded in 1999 by two Iranian entrepreneurs, and has over 750 employees. It is the largest private ISP in Iran, providing a full range of ISP services for both residential and business customers.

Products and services
 ADSL Internet services
 Dialup Internet
 VSAT
 Broadband Internet
 Bandwidth
 Telephone Cards for low cost outgoing international phone calls
 Data Center Services
 VPN
 WiMAX based on WiMAX 802.16e standard, the first provider of this version of WiMAX in Middle East
 NOC (Network Operation Center)
 Network consultation, design and implementation

Pars Online was the first company in Iran to be awarded a PAP license (allowing them to deploy ADSL), and also hold a VSAT license, allowing them to sell VSAT services.

Transfer of shares of the company
Following extensive negotiations, finally in March 2019, Hi Web (a publicly traded company on the Tehran Stock Exchange) purchased all the shares of Pars Online and became 100% owner of the company.

Offices, coverage and representation
The head office is in central Tehran, although Pars Online has many POP's around Tehran and Iran, in addition to agencies in other major cities.

Pars Online offer ADSL and/or other services in the following cities: Ahvaz, Arak, Asalouyeh, Babol, Bandar Abbas, Birjand, Bojnourd (also spelt Bojnoord or Bujnurd), Bushehr, Esfahan (also spelt Isfahan), Qom (also spelt Ghom), Hamedan, Karaj, Kerman, Kermanshah, Mashad, Pardis, Orumieh, Qazvin (also spelt Ghazvin), Rasht, Sanandaj, Sari, Shahriar, Shiraz, Tabriz, Tehran, Yazd, Zahedan and Zanjan.

Data center
Pars Online established the first private data center in Iran at Pardis Technology Park in Pardis, 20 km outside greater Tehran.

Competition
According to a United Nations report, Pars Online, along with Afranet and Neda, are in major competition in VOIP services. Pars Online is in major competition with Afranet, Shatel, Sepanta, Neda Rayaneh, and other local ISPs.

External links
Official Site
Enterprise Solutions & Services
Pars Online Cloud Services

References

Internet service providers of Iran
Telecommunications companies established in 1999
Privately held companies of Iran
Iranian brands
1999 establishments in Iran